is a 1957 color Japanese film directed by Umetsugu Inoue. Yujiro Ishihara won a Blue Ribbon Award in 1958 for best new actor in recognition of his performances in Washi to Taka and Man Who Causes a Storm (also 1957).

Cast 
 Yujiro Ishihara : Senkichi
 Rentarō Mikuni : Sasaki
 Yumeji Tsukioka : Akemi
 Hiroyuki Nagato : Goro
 Ruriko Asaoka : Akiko

References

External links 

1957 films
Films directed by Umetsugu Inoue
Daiei Film films
1950s Japanese films